Diego Osella may refer to:
 Diego Osella (basketball)
 Diego Osella (footballer)